The National Interest was an Australian weekly radio program on the Australian Broadcasting Corporation's Radio National network, covering national issues of interest in depth, with a focus on Australian politics. It ran from 1995 until 16 December 2011.

Terry Lane presented the program from 1995, and retired in 2005, when Peter Mares took over as presenter.

References

External links
 The National Interest program archive

Australian Broadcasting Corporation radio programs